The Minnesota River Conference is a Minnesota high school sports conference that serves mainly the Southwestern Suburbs of the Twin Cities. Mayer Lutheran is furthest north while Tri-City United is furthest south.

Member schools
 Belle Plaine Tigers
 Lester Prairie
 Le Sueur-Henderson Secondary School
 Mayer Lutheran Crusaders
 Norwood Young America Central Raiders
 Sibley East High School
 Tri-City United High School

History

The conference was formed in the late 1950s. In the 1960s and for most of the 70s, teams in the conference were Arlington-Green Isle, Belle Plaine, Jordan, Le Center, Le Sueur, Montgomery, New Prague and Norwood-Young America.  New Prague left the conference beginning with the 1979-80 school year as it had grown much quicker than the other schools. Mankato Loyola replaced New Prague. For the years 1986 through 1989 Henderson High School was paired with Arlington-Green Isle, forming the Sibley East Bengals. In 1990, Henderson paired with Le Sueur, forming what was to become officially in 1992 as the Le Sueur-Henderson School District. Later, Arlington-Green Isle merged with Gaylord and became Sibley East in 1995.  As the other schools got larger, Mankato Loyola and Le Center had stagnate enrollment.  In 2002, Mankato Loyola left and was replaced by Mayer Lutheran.  The following year saw Le Center leave and was replaced by Holy Family Catholic.  In 2011, Holy Family Catholic left and was replaced with Watertown-Mayer.  Beginning with the 2012-2013 school year, Montgomery-Lonsdale consolidated with former conference member Le Center and became Tri-City United. In 2015, Watertown_Mayer left and returned to the Wright County Conference. In the 2018–19 school year, the Minnesota River Conference gained Southwest Christian High School, who previously competed in the Minnesota Christian Athletic Association. SWC left after the 2020-21 school year. At the conclusion of the 2019-2020 school year, Jordan left the conference. Lester Prairie joined beginning in the 2021-22 school year.

Membership timeline

State Champions

The Minnesota River Conference has had success on the big stage when competing in State Tournaments.  Member Schools have won numerous State Championships throughout the years.  The following is a list of Schools along with their respected State Championships:

Jordan: 1980 Softball, 1983 Football, 2006 Volleyball, 2008 Volleyball
Le Sueur: 1982 Girls Golf, 1983 Girls Golf, 1986 Boys Basketball, 1989 Boys Golf, 2021 Softball
Belle Plaine: 1997 Girls Golf, 2015 Volleyball, 2015 Girls Track & Field
Holy Family Catholic: 2004 Dance, 2006 Dance, 2007 Boys Basketball
Mankato Loyola Catholic School: 1989 Baseball, 1994 Dance, 2001 Softball
Montgomery-Lonsdale: 1979 Girls Cross Country, 1984 Boys Cross Country, 1999 Baseball
Mayer Lutheran: 2003 Girls Track & Field, 1982, 2016, 2017 Volleyball
New Prague: 1973 Football, 1974 Football
Sibley East: 1994 Baseball, 1998 Baseball
Le Center: 1982 Football

All-time school records by Minnesota River Conference football wins
This list goes from 1959 through the 2014 season and includes former members, previous cooperatives and present members and lists all-time conference records, overall conference winning percentages, total football conference championships and either if they were solo or co championships and state championships. In 2015, the Minnesota State High School League created football districts instead of conferences.

The following table lists the years when the different school members won the conference in terms of football.

Former Members

New Prague Trojans:		                1959–1979
Mankato-Loyola Catholic School Crusaders:	1979-2002
Le Center Wildcats:		                1959-2003
Holy Family Catholic Fire: 	                2003-2011
Watertown-Mayer Royals:                        2011-2015

References

See also
List of Minnesota State High School League Conferences

Minnesota high school sports conferences